Bugs Bunny's Birthday Ball is a 1990 pinball game designed by John Trudeau and Python Anghelo and released by Midway (under the Bally name). It is based on Warner Bros.' Looney Tunes and Merrie Melodies series of cartoons. This is the first of only two licensed pinball tables ever to feature the Looney Tunes characters (the second being Sega's Space Jam).

Gameplay
The game is a celebration of Bugs Bunny's 50th anniversary, accompanied by his various co-stars and lots of cake. One to four players can play. The player must use the "Skill Shot" to help Wile E. Coyote chase the Road Runner, break some eggs in the reversed "Chicken Coop" playfield, then ride "Tweety's Slide" to the main playfield and score 1 million points, hit Daffy Duck for a "Big Score" of 500,000 points and light "Speedy Gonzales' Keek-Out" for 1 million points, then shoot the curving, swerving center ramp so the Tasmanian Devil and the Tasmanian She-Devil will take the player on a challenging "Tazmanian Shopping Spree" up the ramp, which will score up to 500,000 points or an extra ball. If the player helps Bugs blow out all the candles on his cake, Honey Bunny will reward him with a 50 million bonus, with the player getting their opponents' best score for a Surprise Package.

Playfield
The playfield includes 3 flippers, a plunger skill shot, 3 pop bumpers, 3 slingshots, 19 standup targets, a 3-bank drop target, a kick-out hole, a spinning target, a captive ball, and a left outlane kickback. In the upper left area of the playfield is a small inverted playfield having a flipper to propel the ball downfield to loop around a ramp and hit a captive ball. In multi-player operation, a unique playfield award feature exchanges scores between players.

Development
According to Python Anghelo, the game was made quickly to fill a gap in the Bally production line. When he and John Trudeau were developing the game and The Machine: Bride of Pin-Bot at the same time, they worked insanely fast on both games in a short time. They were doing so much, so fast, that one day Python gave John the nickname of "Doctor Flash". It stuck from that point.

Voice cast
 Greg Burson as Bugs Bunny, Daffy Duck, Speedy Gonzales, Foghorn Leghorn, Barnyard Dawg and Chickens
 Bob Bergen as Porky Pig and Tweety Bird
 Mel Blanc as Yosemite Sam, Sylvester the Cat and Tasmanian Devil (archive recordings)
 Paul Julian as Road Runner (archive recordings)

References

External links
 
Operator's Handbook – via the Internet Archive
YouTube - 7 minutes gameplay of Bugs Bunny's Birthday Ball
YouTube - 5 minutes gameplay of Bugs Bunny's Birthday Ball

1990 pinball machines
Bally pinball machines
Video games featuring Bugs Bunny
Video games featuring Daffy Duck
Video games featuring Sylvester the Cat
Video games featuring the Tasmanian Devil (Looney Tunes)
Video games about birthdays
Cartoon Network video games